The Kiss on the Cruise (Swedish: Kyssen på kryssen) is a 1950 Swedish comedy film directed by Arne Mattsson and starring Annalisa Ericson, Gunnar Björnstrand and  Karl-Arne Holmsten. The film's sets were designed by the art director Nils Svenwall. It was shot at the Råsunda Studios in Stockholm with location shooting in London, Lisbon, Madeira and Morocco.

Synopsis
Lasse Brenner, a celebrated film director known for his realist dramas is offered a contract to take over a film backed by a wealthy manufacturer. Set on a cruise ship, he sees this as a chance of a holiday in which he can bring his wife Sonja, a famous star along. The only stipulation is that the manufacturer's daughter Lisa Yhlén, an aspiring actress, must appear in the film. Sonja takes a dislike to Lisa, who is almost identical to her. The protagonists all head to London where they join the ship heading out to the Mediterranean. A series of mistaken identities ensues.

Cast
 Annalisa Ericson as Sonja Brenner / Lisa Yhlén 
 Gunnar Björnstrand as Film Director Lasse Brenner
 Karl-Arne Holmsten as 	James Deckert
 Åke Grönberg as Knutte Glans
 Jan Molander as 	Josef
 Olof Winnerstrand as 	Deckert
 Bengt Eklund as 	Actor
 Julia Cæsar as 	Cleaning Lady
 Håkan Westergren as 	Felix
 Marianne Löfgren as 	Actress
 Lasse Krantz as Yhlén
 Wiktor Andersson as 	Pettersson 
 Ingegerd Ehn as	Judit Karlsson 
 Anita Rosén as	Vera 
 Harriet Andersson as 	Girl in Brenner's Movie
 Stig Johanson as Painter at the Studio 
 David Erikson as 	Laboratory Manager
 Ludde Juberg as Passenger on 'Saga' 
 Olav Riégo as Ship's Doctor
 Sven Lindberg as 	Academic in Uppsala 
 Åke Lindström as Man 
 Fylgia Zadig as 	Miss Larsson 
 Birger Åsander as 	Pirate 
 Georg Skarstedt as 	Pirate 
 John Melin as 	Pirate 
 Alf Östlund as 	Autograph Hunter
 Alexander von Baumgarten as Proprietor of Bella Vista
 Magnus Kesster as 	Man in the White Suit

References

Bibliography 
 Gustafsson, Fredrik. The Man from the Third Row: Hasse Ekman, Swedish Cinema and the Long Shadow of Ingmar Bergman. Berghahn Books, 2016.
 Qvist, Per Olov & von Bagh, Peter. Guide to the Cinema of Sweden and Finland. Greenwood Publishing Group, 2000.

External links 
 

1950 films
Swedish comedy films
1950 comedy films
1950s Swedish-language films
Films directed by Arne Mattsson
Swedish black-and-white films
Films about filmmaking
Seafaring films
Films set in Stockholm
Films shot in Stockholm
Films set in London
Films shot in London
Films set in Lisbon
Films shot in Lisbon
Films set in Tangier
Films set in Casablanca
Films shot in Morocco
1950s Swedish films